Belpahar English Medium School (School Code OR038) is a co-educational Higher Secondary School (HSC) of Belpahar region in Odisha affiliated to CISCE, New Delhi for ICSE (Class X) and ISC (Class XII). As of 2016, BEMS is headed by Mrs. Rama Karthik, principal, who currently holds the post of the vice president of both Orissa Associations of ICSE Schools (OAICSE) and  All India Associations of ICSE Schools (ICSE).

History
The school started as a kindergarten School in the year 1968 by The Hand Maids of Mary, Sundergarh with the objective of offering primary education to the children of the officers of Tata Refractories Limited, now known as TRL Krosaki Refractories Limited. In 1977, it was taken over by the company. As of 2016 this school is under the aegis of  Belpahar Educational Society (BEST).

Uniform
The students of the school wear uniform. White half sleeved shirt, house T-Shirt, belt, school tie, white socks, white canvas shoes, navy blue socks and navy blue blazer for winter are common for all classes. Boys of Classes I to V must have white shorts, steel grey shorts, black laced boots, while those from Classes VI to XII must wear white trousers, steel grey trousers, black laced boots. Girls irrespective of their classes must wear white knee length box pleaded skirts, steel grey neck pinafore, navy blue and white winter stockings and black buckled shoes.

House system
Students after their admissions are horizontally divided into  houses. The four houses are Gandhi with red colour, Radhakrishnan with green colour, Tagore with yellow colour and Tata with blue colour. These houses are named after great Indian leaders – Gandhi standing for Mohandas Karamchand Gandhi, Radhakrishnan for Dr. Sarvepalli Radhakrishnan, Tagore for Rabindranath Tagore and Tata for J. R. D. Tata.

Activities
The school is represented every year in various district, state and national level competitions. It also holds competitive examinations like Talent Search Competition (TSE), National Olympiads and quizzes headed by the principal of the school. It has also got awards for doing well in NCC, tennikoit, football, cricket, badminton, chess and kick boxing. Sambalpur NCC Group secured an overall first position in the Odisha directorate inter-group  competition for boys at Thal Sainik Camp (TSC) in Puri. Cadets from the school performed well in both senior and junior categories. The cadets were selected in the Odisha Directed team. The school also represented the BOURNVITA Quiz competition. Chiranjibi Pradhan represented BEMS  in TCS IT WIZ Bhubaneshwar edition, 2018 and secured a historic win for the school

See also
Education in India
Jharsuguda

References

External links

Schools in Odisha
Jharsuguda district
1968 establishments in Orissa
Educational institutions established in 1968